Idir may refer to:

People
 Ali Idir (born 1966), Algerian judoka
 Idir (singer) (1949–2020), Algerian singer-songwriter and musician
 Idir Khourta (born 1986), French-born Algerian table tennis player
 Idir Ouali (born 1988), French-Algerian football player
 Jamel Aït Ben Idir (born 1984), French-Moroccan football player
 Mustafa Ait Idir, terrorist
 Thomas Idir or Sinik (born 1980), French-language rap artist

Places
 Idir, Iran (disambiguation)
 Îdir or Iğdır, Turkey